Comrat - also very common is the spelling Komrat (Cyrillic script: Комрат (Komrat)) - lies within the southern wine region of Moldova, which specialises in red wine and muscat production.

Location
Comrat lies in Gagauzia, more than 80 km away from its capital - Chişinău city. The town sprawls along the tiny river Ialpug. The area around the town is rather hilly. The Moldavian-Ukrainian border is located in the East, less than 25 km away; the border with Romania is about 40 km to the West.

See also
Moldovan wine

References

Wine regions of Moldova
Comrat